The Time Has Come: The Best of Ziggy Marley & the Melody Makers is the first greatest hits release from Ziggy Marley and the Melody Makers.

Track listing
"Give A Little Love"
"Get Up Jah Jah Children"
"Freedom Road"
"Children Playing In The Streets"
"Lyin' In Bed"
"Aiding And Abetting"
"Say People"
"Natty Dread Rampage"
"Naah Leggo"
"Met Her On A Rainy Day"
"Reggae Revolution"
"Reggae Is Now"

Ziggy Marley and the Melody Makers albums
1988 compilation albums
Reggae compilation albums